Steven Goodman may refer to:
 Steven N. Goodman, American professor of epidemiology and population health
 Steven M. Goodman (born 1957), American conservation biologist
 Steve Goodman (1948–1984), American folk and country singer-songwriter